Garra lamta is a species of cyprinid in the genus Garra from south Asia.

References

Garra
Fish described in 1822